Fresh Breeze GmbH & Co Kg is a German aircraft manufacturer based in Wedemark.  The company specializes in the design and manufacturer of paramotors and powered parachutes.

Reviewers Noel Bertrand, et al., described the company as "one of the world’s main paramotor manufacturers."

Aircraft

References

External links

Aircraft manufacturers of Germany
Paramotors